The following lists events that happened during 1945 in the Union of Soviet Socialist Republics.

Incumbents
General Secretary of the Communist Party of the Soviet Union – Joseph Stalin
Chairman of the Presidium of the Supreme Soviet of the Soviet Union – Mikhail Kalinin
Chairman of the Council of People's Commissars of the Soviet Union – Joseph Stalin

Events
 January 12 – WWII: The Soviet Union begins the Vistula–Oder Offensive in Eastern Europe, against the German Army.
 January 13 – WWII: The Soviet Union begins the East Prussian Offensive, to eliminate German forces in East Prussia.
 January 17 – WWII: The Soviet Union occupies Warsaw, Poland.

Births
 13 March – Anatoly Fomenko, Russian mathematician
 31 March – Lidiya Belozyorova, Ukrainian actress (d. 2022)
 9 August – Zurab Sakandelidze, Georgian basketball player (d. 2004)
 3 October – Viktor Saneyev, Georgian triple jumper, Olympic champion (d. 2022)

Deaths
 21 January – Joachim von Busse, World War I flying ace (born 1893)
 3 March – Karl Thom, World War I German flying ace (born 1893)

See also
1945 in fine arts of the Soviet Union
List of Soviet films of 1945

References

 
1940s in the Soviet Union
Years in the Soviet Union
Soviet Union
Soviet Union
Soviet Union